

Peerage of England, Scotland and Great Britain

Dukes

|colspan=5 style="background: #fcc" align="center"|Peerage of England
|-
|Duke of Cornwall (1337)||Frederick, Prince of Wales||1727||1751||Died
|-
|Duke of Norfolk (1483)||Edward Howard, 9th Duke of Norfolk||1732||1777||
|-
|rowspan=3|Duke of Somerset (1547)||Algernon Seymour, 7th Duke of Somerset||1748||1750||Died
|-
|Edward Seymour, 8th Duke of Somerset||1750||1757||Died
|-
|Edward Seymour, 9th Duke of Somerset||1757||1792||
|-
|Duke of Cleveland (1670)||William FitzRoy, 3rd Duke of Cleveland||1730||1774||
|-
|rowspan=2|Duke of Richmond (1675)||Charles Lennox, 2nd Duke of Richmond||1723||1750||Died
|-
|Charles Lennox, 3rd Duke of Richmond||1750||1806||
|-
|rowspan=2|Duke of Grafton (1675)||Charles FitzRoy, 2nd Duke of Grafton||1690||1757||Died
|-
|Augustus FitzRoy, 3rd Duke of Grafton||1757||1811||
|-
|rowspan=2|Duke of Beaufort (1682)||Charles Somerset, 4th Duke of Beaufort||1745||1756||Died
|-
|Henry Somerset, 5th Duke of Beaufort||1756||1803||
|-
|rowspan=2|Duke of St Albans (1684)||Charles Beauclerk, 2nd Duke of St Albans||1726||1751||Died
|-
|George Beauclerk, 3rd Duke of St Albans||1751||1786||
|-
|rowspan=3|Duke of Bolton (1689)||Charles Powlett, 3rd Duke of Bolton||1722||1754||Died
|-
|Harry Powlett, 4th Duke of Bolton||1754||1759||Died
|-
|Charles Powlett, 5th Duke of Bolton||1759||1765||
|-
|Duke of Leeds (1694)||Thomas Osborne, 4th Duke of Leeds||1731||1789||
|-
|Duke of Bedford (1694)||John Russell, 4th Duke of Bedford||1732||1771||
|-
|rowspan=2|Duke of Devonshire (1694)||William Cavendish, 3rd Duke of Devonshire||1729||1755||Died
|-
|William Cavendish, 4th Duke of Devonshire||1755||1764||
|-
|rowspan=2|Duke of Marlborough (1702)||Charles Spencer, 3rd Duke of Marlborough||1733||1758||Died
|-
|George Spencer, 4th Duke of Marlborough||1758||1817||
|-
|Duke of Rutland (1703)||John Manners, 3rd Duke of Rutland||1721||1779||
|-
|colspan=5 style="background: #fcc" align="center"|Peerage of Scotland
|-
|rowspan=2|Duke of Hamilton (1643)||James Hamilton, 6th Duke of Hamilton||1743||1758||Died
|-
|James Hamilton, 7th Duke of Hamilton||1758||1769||
|-
|rowspan=2|Duke of Buccleuch (1663)||Francis Scott, 2nd Duke of Buccleuch||1732||1751||Died
|-
|Henry Scott, 3rd Duke of Buccleuch||1751||1812||
|-
|Duke of Queensberry (1684)||Charles Douglas, 3rd Duke of Queensberry||1711||1778||
|-
|rowspan=2|Duke of Gordon (1684)||Cosmo Gordon, 3rd Duke of Gordon||1728||1752||Died
|-
|Alexander Gordon, 4th Duke of Gordon||1752||1827||
|-
|Duke of Argyll (1701)||Archibald Campbell, 3rd Duke of Argyll||1743||1761||
|-
|Duke of Atholl (1703)||James Murray, 2nd Duke of Atholl||1724||1764||
|-
|Duke of Douglas (1703)||Archibald Douglas, 1st Duke of Douglas||1703||1761||
|-
|Duke of Montrose (1707)||William Graham, 2nd Duke of Montrose||1742||1790||
|-
|rowspan=2|Duke of Roxburghe (1707)||Robert Ker, 2nd Duke of Roxburghe||1741||1755||Died
|-
|John Ker, 3rd Duke of Roxburghe||1755||1804||
|-
|colspan=5 style="background: #fcc" align="center"|Peerage of Great Britain
|-
|Duke of Ancaster and Kesteven (1715)||Peregrine Bertie, 3rd Duke of Ancaster and Kesteven||1742||1778||
|-
|Duke of Kingston-upon-Hull (1715)||Evelyn Pierrepont, 2nd Duke of Kingston-upon-Hull||1726||1773||
|-
|Duke of Newcastle upon Tyne (1715)||Thomas Pelham-Holles, 1st Duke of Newcastle||1715||1768||Created Newcastle-under-Lyne in 1756
|-
|Duke of Portland (1716)||William Bentinck, 2nd Duke of Portland||1726||1762||
|-
|Duke of Manchester (1719)||Robert Montagu, 3rd Duke of Manchester||1739||1762||
|-
|Duke of Chandos (1719)||Henry Brydges, 2nd Duke of Chandos||1744||1771||
|-
|Duke of Dorset (1720)||Lionel Sackville, 1st Duke of Dorset||1720||1765||
|-
|Duke of Bridgewater (1720)||Francis Egerton, 3rd Duke of Bridgewater||1748||1803||
|-
|Duke of Cumberland (1726)||Prince William, Duke of Cumberland||1726||1765||
|-
|}

Marquesses

|colspan=5 style="background: #fcc" align="center"|Peerage of England
|-
|colspan=5 align="center"|-
|-
|colspan=5 style="background: #fcc" align="center"|Peerage of Scotland
|-
|Marquess of Tweeddale (1694)||John Hay, 4th Marquess of Tweeddale||1715||1762||
|-
|Marquess of Lothian (1701)||William Kerr, 3rd Marquess of Lothian||1722||1767||
|-
|Marquess of Annandale (1701)||George Vanden-Bempde, 3rd Marquess of Annandale||1730||1792||
|-
|colspan=5 style="background: #fcc" align="center"|Peerage of Great Britain
|-
|Marquess Grey (1740)||Jemima Yorke, 2nd Marchioness Grey||1740||1797||
|-
|rowspan=2|Marquess of Rockingham (1746)||Thomas Watson-Wentworth, 1st Marquess of Rockingham||1746||1750||Died
|-
|Charles Watson-Wentworth, 2nd Marquess of Rockingham||1750||1782||
|-
|}

Earls

|colspan=5 style="background: #fcc" align="center"|Peerage of England
|-
|Earl of Shrewsbury (1442)||George Talbot, 14th Earl of Shrewsbury||1743||1787||
|-
|Earl of Derby (1485)||Edward Stanley, 11th Earl of Derby||1736||1776||
|-
|Earl of Huntingdon (1529)||Francis Hastings, 10th Earl of Huntingdon||1746||1789||
|-
|Earl of Pembroke (1551)||Henry Herbert, 10th Earl of Pembroke||1749||1794||
|-
|Earl of Devon (1553)||William Courtenay, de jure 7th Earl of Devon||1735||1762||
|-
|Earl of Lincoln (1572)||Henry Clinton, 9th Earl of Lincoln||1730||1794||
|-
|rowspan=2|Earl of Suffolk (1603)||Henry Howard, 11th Earl of Suffolk||1745||1757||Died
|-
|Henry Howard, 12th Earl of Suffolk||1757||1779||
|-
|rowspan=2|Earl of Exeter (1605)||Brownlow Cecil, 8th Earl of Exeter||1722||1754||Died
|-
|Brownlow Cecil, 9th Earl of Exeter||1754||1793||
|-
|Earl of Salisbury (1605)||James Cecil, 6th Earl of Salisbury||1728||1780||
|-
|rowspan=3|Earl of Northampton (1618)||James Compton, 5th Earl of Northampton||1727||1754||Died
|-
|George Compton, 6th Earl of Northampton||1754||1758||Died
|-
|Charles Compton, 7th Earl of Northampton||1758||1763||
|-
|Earl of Warwick (1618)||Edward Rich, 8th Earl of Warwick||1721||1759||Died, title extinct
|-
|rowspan=2|Earl of Denbigh (1622)||William Feilding, 5th Earl of Denbigh||1717||1755||Died
|-
|Basil Feilding, 6th Earl of Denbigh||1755||1800||
|-
|Earl of Westmorland (1624)||John Fane, 7th Earl of Westmorland||1736||1762||
|-
|Earl of Peterborough (1628)||Charles Mordaunt, 4th Earl of Peterborough||1735||1779||
|-
|Earl of Stamford (1628)||Harry Grey, 4th Earl of Stamford||1739||1768||
|-
|Earl of Winchilsea (1628)||Daniel Finch, 8th Earl of Winchilsea||1730||1769||
|-
|Earl of Chesterfield (1628)||Philip Stanhope, 4th Earl of Chesterfield||1726||1773||
|-
|rowspan=2|Earl of Thanet (1628)||Sackville Tufton, 7th Earl of Thanet||1729||1753||Died
|-
|Sackville Tufton, 8th Earl of Thanet||1753||1786||
|-
|Earl of Sandwich (1660)||John Montagu, 4th Earl of Sandwich||1729||1792||
|-
|Earl of Anglesey (1661)||Richard Annesley, 6th Earl of Anglesey||1737||1761||
|-
|Earl of Cardigan (1661)||George Brudenell, 4th Earl of Cardigan||1732||1790||
|-
|Earl of Clarendon (1661)||Henry Hyde, 4th Earl of Clarendon||1723||1753||Died, title extinct
|-
|Earl of Essex (1661)||William Capell, 4th Earl of Essex||1743||1799||
|-
|rowspan=2|Earl of Carlisle (1661)||Henry Howard, 4th Earl of Carlisle||1738||1758||Died
|-
|Frederick Howard, 5th Earl of Carlisle||1758||1825||
|-
|Earl of Burlington (1664)||Richard Boyle, 3rd Earl of Burlington||1704||1753||Earl of Cork in the Peerage of Ireland; died, title extinct
|-
|Earl of Shaftesbury (1672)||Anthony Ashley Cooper, 4th Earl of Shaftesbury||1713||1771||
|-
|Earl of Lichfield (1674)||George Lee, 3rd Earl of Lichfield||1742||1772||
|-
|Earl of Radnor (1679)||John Robartes, 4th Earl of Radnor||1741||1757||Died, title extinct
|-
|rowspan=2|Earl of Berkeley (1679)||Augustus Berkeley, 4th Earl of Berkeley||1736||1755||Died
|-
|Frederick Augustus Berkeley, 5th Earl of Berkeley||1755||1810||
|-
|Earl of Abingdon (1682)||Willoughby Bertie, 3rd Earl of Abingdon||1743||1760||
|-
|rowspan=3|Earl of Gainsborough (1682)||Baptist Noel, 4th Earl of Gainsborough||1714||1751||Died
|-
|Baptist Noel, 5th Earl of Gainsborough||1751||1759||Died
|-
|Henry Noel, 6th Earl of Gainsborough||1759||1798||
|-
|Earl of Plymouth (1682)||Other Windsor, 4th Earl of Plymouth||1732||1771||
|-
|Earl of Holderness (1682)||Robert Darcy, 4th Earl of Holderness||1722||1778||
|-
|rowspan=2|Earl of Stafford (1688)||William Stafford-Howard, 3rd Earl of Stafford||1734||1751||Died
|-
|John Paul Stafford-Howard, 4th Earl of Stafford||1751||1762||
|-
|Earl of Warrington (1690)||George Booth, 2nd Earl of Warrington||1694||1758||Died, title extinct
|-
|rowspan=2|Earl of Scarbrough (1690)||Thomas Lumley-Saunderson, 3rd Earl of Scarbrough||1739||1752||Died
|-
|Richard Lumley-Saunderson, 4th Earl of Scarbrough||1752||1782||
|-
|Earl of Bradford (1694)||Thomas Newport, 4th Earl of Bradford||1734||1762||
|-
|Earl of Rochford (1695)||William Nassau de Zuylestein, 4th Earl of Rochford||1738||1781||
|-
|rowspan=2|Earl of Albemarle (1697)||Willem van Keppel, 2nd Earl of Albemarle||1718||1754||Died
|-
|George Keppel, 3rd Earl of Albemarle||1754||1772||
|-
|rowspan=2|Earl of Coventry (1697)||William Coventry, 5th Earl of Coventry||1719||1751||Died
|-
|George Coventry, 6th Earl of Coventry||1751||1809||
|-
|Earl of Jersey (1697)||William Villiers, 3rd Earl of Jersey||1721||1769||
|-
|Earl of Grantham (1698)||Henry de Nassau d'Auverquerque, 1st Earl of Grantham||1698||1754||Died, title extinct
|-
|Earl Poulett (1706)||John Poulett, 2nd Earl Poulett||1743||1764||
|-
|Earl of Godolphin (1706)||Francis Godolphin, 2nd Earl of Godolphin||1712||1766||
|-
|Earl of Cholmondeley (1706)||George Cholmondeley, 3rd Earl of Cholmondeley||1733||1770||
|-
|colspan=5 style="background: #fcc" align="center"|Peerage of Scotland
|-
|Earl of Crawford (1398)||George Lindsay-Crawford, 21st Earl of Crawford||1749||1781||
|-
|rowspan=2|Earl of Erroll (1452)||Mary Hay, 14th Countess of Erroll||1717||1758||Died
|-
|James Hay, 15th Earl of Erroll||1758||1778||
|-
|rowspan=2|Earl of Sutherland (1235)||William Sutherland, 17th Earl of Sutherland||1733||1750||Died
|-
|William Sutherland, 18th Earl of Sutherland||1750||1766||
|-
|Earl of Rothes (1458)||John Leslie, 10th Earl of Rothes||1722||1767||
|-
|Earl of Morton (1458)||James Douglas, 14th Earl of Morton||1738||1768||
|-
|Earl of Glencairn (1488)||William Cunningham, 13th Earl of Glencairn||1734||1775||
|-
|Earl of Eglinton (1507)||Alexander Montgomerie, 10th Earl of Eglinton||1729||1769||
|-
|rowspan=2|Earl of Cassilis (1509)||John Kennedy, 8th Earl of Cassilis||1701||1759||Died
|-
|Thomas Kennedy, 9th Earl of Cassilis||1759||1775||
|-
|Earl of Caithness (1455)||Alexander Sinclair, 9th Earl of Caithness||1705||1765||
|-
|Earl of Buchan (1469)||Henry Erskine, 10th Earl of Buchan||1745||1767||
|-
|Earl of Moray (1562)||James Stuart, 8th Earl of Moray||1739||1767||
|-
|Earl of Home (1605)||William Home, 8th Earl of Home||1720||1761||
|-
|Earl of Abercorn (1606)||James Hamilton, 8th Earl of Abercorn||1744||1789||
|-
|rowspan=2|Earl of Strathmore and Kinghorne (1606)||Thomas Lyon, 8th Earl of Strathmore and Kinghorne||1735||1753||Died
|-
|John Bowes, 9th Earl of Strathmore and Kinghorne||1753||1776||
|-
|rowspan=2|Earl of Kellie (1619)||Alexander Erskine, 5th Earl of Kellie||1710||1758||Died
|-
|Thomas Erskine, 6th Earl of Kellie||1758||1781||
|-
|Earl of Haddington (1619)||Thomas Hamilton, 7th Earl of Haddington||1735||1794||
|-
|Earl of Galloway (1623)||Alexander Stewart, 6th Earl of Galloway||1746||1773||
|-
|Earl of Lauderdale (1624)||James Maitland, 7th Earl of Lauderdale||1744||1789||
|-
|Earl of Loudoun (1633)||John Campbell, 4th Earl of Loudoun||1731||1782||
|-
|rowspan=2|Earl of Kinnoull (1633)||George Hay, 8th Earl of Kinnoull||1709||1758||Died
|-
|Thomas Hay, 9th Earl of Kinnoull||1758||1787||
|-
|Earl of Dumfries (1633)||William Dalrymple-Crichton, 5th Earl of Dumfries||1742||1769||
|-
|Earl of Elgin (1633)||Charles Bruce, 5th Earl of Elgin||1747||1771||
|-
|Earl of Traquair (1633)||Charles Stewart, 5th Earl of Traquair||1741||1764||
|-
|Earl of Wemyss (1633)||James Wemyss, 5th Earl of Wemyss||1720||1756||Died; heir to the peerage was under attainder
|-
|Earl of Dalhousie (1633)||Charles Ramsay, 7th Earl of Dalhousie||1739||1764||
|-
|Earl of Findlater (1638)||James Ogilvy, 5th Earl of Findlater||1730||1764||
|-
|rowspan=2|Earl of Leven (1641)||Alexander Leslie, 5th Earl of Leven||1728||1754||Died
|-
|David Leslie, 6th Earl of Leven||1754||1802||
|-
|Earl of Dysart (1643)||Lionel Tollemache, 4th Earl of Dysart||1727||1770||
|-
|Earl of Selkirk (1646)||Dunbar Douglas, 4th Earl of Selkirk||1744||1799||
|-
|Earl of Northesk (1647)||George Carnegie, 6th Earl of Northesk||1741||1792||
|-
|Earl of Balcarres (1651)||James Lindsay, 5th Earl of Balcarres||1736||1768||
|-
|Earl of Aboyne (1660)||Charles Gordon, 4th Earl of Aboyne||1732||1794||
|-
|rowspan=2|Earl of Newburgh (1660)||Charles Livingston, 2nd Earl of Newburgh||1670||1755||Died
|-
|James Radclyffe, 4th Earl of Newburgh||1755||1786||
|-
|rowspan=2|Earl of Dundonald (1669)||William Cochrane, 7th Earl of Dundonald||1737||1758||Died
|-
|Thomas Cochrane, 8th Earl of Dundonald||1758||1778||
|-
|rowspan=2|Earl of Kintore (1677)||John Keith, 3rd Earl of Kintore||1718||1758||Died
|-
|William Keith, 4th Earl of Kintore||1758||1761||
|-
|rowspan=2|Earl of Breadalbane and Holland (1677)||John Campbell, 2nd Earl of Breadalbane and Holland||1717||1752||Died
|-
|John Campbell, 3rd Earl of Breadalbane and Holland||1752||1782||
|-
|Earl of Aberdeen (1682)||George Gordon, 3rd Earl of Aberdeen||1746||1801||
|-
|rowspan=3|Earl of Dunmore (1686)||John Murray, 2nd Earl of Dunmore||1710||1752||Died
|-
|William Murray, 3rd Earl of Dunmore||1752||1756||Died
|-
|John Murray, 4th Earl of Dunmore||1752||1809||
|-
|rowspan=2|Earl of Orkney (1696)||Anne O'Brien, 2nd Countess of Orkney||1737||1756||Died
|-
|Mary O'Brien, 3rd Countess of Orkney||1756||1790||
|-
|Earl of March (1697)||William Douglas, 3rd Earl of March||1731||1810||
|-
|Earl of Marchmont (1697)||Hugh Hume-Campbell, 3rd Earl of Marchmont||1740||1794||
|-
|Earl of Hyndford (1701)||John Carmichael, 3rd Earl of Hyndford||1737||1766||
|-
|Earl of Stair (1703)||James Dalrymple, 3rd Earl of Stair||1747||1760||
|-
|Earl of Rosebery (1703)||James Primrose, 2nd Earl of Rosebery||1723||1765||
|-
|Earl of Glasgow (1703)||John Boyle, 3rd Earl of Glasgow||1740||1775||
|-
|Earl of Portmore (1703)||Charles Colyear, 2nd Earl of Portmore||1730||1785||
|-
|Earl of Bute (1703)||John Stuart, 3rd Earl of Bute||1723||1792||
|-
|Earl of Hopetoun (1703)||John Hope, 2nd Earl of Hopetoun||1742||1781||
|-
|Earl of Deloraine (1706)||Henry Scott, 4th Earl of Deloraine||1740||1807||
|-
|colspan=5 style="background: #fcc" align="center"|Peerage of Great Britain
|-
|rowspan=2|Earl of Oxford and Mortimer (1711)||Edward Harley, 3rd Earl of Oxford and Earl Mortimer||1741||1755||Died
|-
|Edward Harley, 4th Earl of Oxford and Earl Mortimer||1755||1790||
|-
|Earl of Strafford (1711)||William Wentworth, 2nd Earl of Strafford||1739||1791||
|-
|Earl Ferrers (1711)||Laurence Shirley, 4th Earl Ferrers||1745||1760||
|-
|rowspan=2|Earl of Dartmouth (1711)||William Legge, 1st Earl of Dartmouth||1711||1750||Died
|-
|William Legge, 2nd Earl of Dartmouth||1750||1801||
|-
|rowspan=2|Earl of Tankerville (1714)||Charles Bennet, 2nd Earl of Tankerville||1722||1753||Died
|-
|Charles Bennet, 3rd Earl of Tankerville||1753||1767||
|-
|rowspan=2|Earl of Aylesford (1714)||Heneage Finch, 2nd Earl of Aylesford||1740||1757||Died
|-
|Heneage Finch, 3rd Earl of Aylesford||1757||1777||
|-
|rowspan=2|Earl of Bristol (1714)||John Hervey, 1st Earl of Bristol||1714||1751||Died
|-
|George Hervey, 2nd Earl of Bristol||1751||1775||
|-
|Earl of Uxbridge (1714)||Henry Paget, 2nd Earl of Uxbridge||1743||1769||
|-
|Earl Granville (1715)||John Carteret, 2nd Earl Granville||1744||1763||
|-
|Earl of Halifax (1715)||George Montagu-Dunk, 2nd Earl of Halifax||1739||1771||
|-
|rowspan=2|Earl of Sussex (1717)||George Yelverton, 2nd Earl of Sussex||1731||1758||Died
|-
|Henry Yelverton, 3rd Earl of Sussex||1758||1799||
|-
||Earl Cowper (1718)||William Clavering-Cowper, 2nd Earl Cowper||1723||1764||
|-
|Earl Stanhope (1718)||Philip Stanhope, 2nd Earl Stanhope||1721||1786||
|-
|Earl Coningsby (1719)||Margaret Newton, 2nd Countess Coningsby||1729||1761||
|-
|rowspan=2|Earl of Harborough (1719)||Philip Sherard, 2nd Earl of Harborough||1732||1750||Died
|-
|Bennet Sherard, 3rd Earl of Harborough||1750||1770||
|-
|Earl of Macclesfield (1721)||George Parker, 2nd Earl of Macclesfield||1732||1764||
|-
|rowspan=2|Earl of Pomfret (1721)||Thomas Fermor, 1st Earl of Pomfret||1721||1753||Died
|-
|George Fermor, 2nd Earl of Pomfret||1753||1785||
|-
|Countess of Walsingham (1722)||Melusina von der Schulenburg, Countess of Walsingham||1722||1778||
|-
|Earl Waldegrave (1729)||James Waldegrave, 2nd Earl Waldegrave||1741||1763||
|-
|Earl of Ashburnham (1730)||John Ashburnham, 2nd Earl of Ashburnham||1737||1812||
|-
|Earl FitzWalter (1730)||Benjamin Mildmay, 1st Earl FitzWalter||1730||1756||Died; Peerage extinct
|-
|Earl of Effingham (1731)||Thomas Howard, 2nd Earl of Effingham||1743||1763||
|-
|Countess of Yarmouth (1740)||Amalie von Wallmoden, Countess of Yarmouth||1743||1765||
|-
|rowspan=2|Earl of Orford (1742)||Robert Walpole, 2nd Earl of Orford||1745||1751||Died
|-
|George Walpole, 3rd Earl of Orford||1751||1791||
|-
|rowspan=2|Earl of Harrington (1742)||William Stanhope, 1st Earl of Harrington||1742||1756||Died
|-
|William Stanhope, 2nd Earl of Harrington||1756||1779||
|-
|Earl of Bath (1742)||William Pulteney, 1st Earl of Bath||1742||1764||
|-
|Earl of Portsmouth (1743)||John Wallop, 1st Earl of Portsmouth||1743||1762||
|-
|Earl of Leicester (1744)||Thomas Coke, 1st Earl of Leicester||1744||1759||Died; Peerage extinct
|-
|Earl Brooke (1746)||Francis Greville, 1st Earl Brooke||1746||1773||Created Earl of Warwick in 1759
|-
|Earl Clinton (1746)||Hugh Fortescue, 1st Earl Clinton||1746||1751||Died; Peerage extinct
|-
|rowspan=2|Earl Gower (1746)||John Leveson-Gower, 1st Earl Gower||1746||1754||Died
|-
|Granville Leveson-Gower, 2nd Earl Gower||1754||1803||
|-
|rowspan=2|Earl of Buckinghamshire (1746)||John Hobart, 1st Earl of Buckinghamshire||1746||1756||Died
|-
|John Hobart, 2nd Earl of Buckinghamshire||1756||1793||
|-
|rowspan=2|Earl Fitzwilliam (1746)||William Fitzwilliam, 1st Earl Fitzwilliam||1746||1756||Died
|-
|William Fitzwilliam, 2nd Earl Fitzwilliam||1756||1833||
|-
|Earl of Powis (1748)||Henry Herbert, 1st Earl of Powis||1748||1772||
|-
|Earl of Northumberland (1749)||Hugh Percy, 2nd Earl of Northumberland||1750||1786||Peerage previously held by the Duke of Somerset 
|-
|Earl of Egremont (1748)||Charles Wyndham, 2nd Earl of Egremont||1750||1763||Peerage previously held by the Duke of Somerset 
|-
|rowspan=2|Earl Temple (1749)||Hester Grenville, 1st Countess Temple||1749||1752||Died
|-
|Richard Grenville-Temple, 2nd Earl Temple||1752||1779||
|-
|Earl Harcourt (1749)||Simon Harcourt, 1st Earl Harcourt||1749||1777||
|-
|Earl of Hertford (1750)||Francis Seymour-Conway, 1st Earl of Hertford||1750||1794||New creation
|-
|Earl of Guilford (1752)||Francis North, 1st Earl of Guilford||1752||1790||New creation
|-
|Earl Cornwallis (1753)||Charles Cornwallis, 1st Earl Cornwallis||1753||1762||New creation
|-
|Earl of Hardwicke (1754)||Philip Yorke, 1st Earl of Hardwicke||1753||1764||New creation
|-
|rowspan=2|Earl of Darlington (1754)||Henry Vane, 1st Earl of Darlington||1754||1758||New creation; died
|-
|Henry Vane, 2nd Earl of Darlington||1758||1792||
|-
|Earl Fauconberg (1756)||Thomas Belasyse, 1st Earl Fauconberg||1756||1774||New creation
|-
|Earl of Ilchester (1756)||Stephen Fox-Strangways, 1st Earl of Ilchester||1756||1776||New creation
|-
|}

Viscounts

|colspan=5 style="background: #fcc" align="center"|Peerage of England
|-
|Viscount Hereford (1550)||Edward Devereux, 11th Viscount Hereford||1748||1760||
|-
|Viscount Montagu (1554)||Anthony Browne, 6th Viscount Montagu||1717||1767||
|-
|Viscount Saye and Sele (1624)||Richard Fiennes, 6th Viscount Saye and Sele||1742||1781||
|-
|Viscount Fauconberg (1643)||Thomas Belasyse, 4th Viscount Fauconberg||1718||1774||Created Earl Fauconberg, see above
|-
|Viscount Hatton (1682)||William Seton Hatton, 2nd Viscount Hatton||1706||1760||
|-
|Viscount Townshend (1682)||Charles Townshend, 3rd Viscount Townshend||1738||1764||
|-
|rowspan=2|Viscount Weymouth (1682)||Thomas Thynne, 2nd Viscount Weymouth||1714||1751||Died
|-
|Thomas Thynne, 3rd Viscount Weymouth||1751||1796||
|-
|Viscount Lonsdale (1690)||Henry Lowther, 3rd Viscount Lonsdale||1713||1751||Died, title extinct
|-
|colspan=5 style="background: #fcc" align="center"|Peerage of Scotland
|-
|Viscount of Falkland (1620)||Lucius Cary, 7th Viscount Falkland||1730||1785||
|-
|Viscount of Stormont (1621)||David Murray, 7th Viscount of Stormont||1748||1796||
|-
|rowspan=2|Viscount of Arbuthnott (1641)||John Arbuthnot, 5th Viscount of Arbuthnott||1710||1756||Died
|-
|John Arbuthnot, 6th Viscount of Arbuthnott||1756||1791||
|-
|Viscount of Irvine (1661)||Henry Ingram, 7th Viscount of Irvine||1736||1761||
|-
|colspan=5 style="background: #fcc" align="center"|Peerage of Great Britain
|-
|rowspan=2|Viscount Bolingbroke (1712)||Henry St John, 1st Viscount Bolingbroke||1712||1751||Died
|-
|Frederick St John, 2nd Viscount Bolingbroke||1751||1787||
|-
|Viscount St John (1716)||Frederick  St John, 3rd Viscount St John||1748||1787||Inherited the senior Viscountcy of Bolingbroke in 1751
|-
|Viscount Cobham (1718)||Hester Grenville, 2nd Viscountess Cobham||1749||1752||Created Countess Temple, see above
|-
|Viscount Falmouth (1720)||Hugh Boscawen, 2nd Viscount Falmouth||1734||1782||
|-
|rowspan=2|Viscount Torrington (1721)||George Byng, 3rd Viscount Torrington||1747||1750||Died
|-
|George Byng, 4th Viscount Torrington||1750||1812||
|-
|Viscount Leinster (1747)||James FitzGerald, 1st Viscount Leinster||1747||1773||Earl of Kildare in the Peerage of Ireland
|-
|Viscount Folkestone (1747)||Jacob Bouverie, 1st Viscount Folkestone||1747||1761||
|-
|}

Barons

|colspan=5 style="background: #fcc" align="center"|Peerage of England
|-
|Baron Ferrers of Chartley (1299)||Charlotte Townshend, 16th Baroness Ferrers of Chartley||1749||1770||
|- 
|Baron de Clifford (1299)||Margaret Coke, 19th Baroness de Clifford||1734||1775||
|- 
|rowspan=2|Baron Dacre (1321)||Anne Barrett-Lennard, 16th Baroness Dacre||1741||1755||Died
|- 
|Thomas Barrett-Lennard, 17th Baron Dacre||1755||1786||
|- 
|Baron Dudley (1440)||Ferdinando Dudley Lea, 11th Baron Dudley||1740||1757||Died, Barony fell into abeyance
|- 
|rowspan="2"|Baron Stourton (1448)||Charles Stourton, 15th Baron Stourton||1744||1753||Died
|- 
|William Stourton, 16th Baron Stourton||1753||1781||
|- 
|rowspan="2"|Baron Willoughby de Broke (1491)||Richard Verney, 13th Baron Willoughby de Broke||1728||1752||Died
|- 
|John Peyto-Verney, 14th Baron Willoughby de Broke||1752||1816||
|- 
|Baron Wentworth (1529)||Edward Noel, 9th Baron Wentworth||1745||1774||
|-
|Baron Wharton (1544)||Jane Wharton, 7th Baroness Wharton||1739||1761||
|-
|Baron Willoughby of Parham (1547)||Hugh Willoughby, 15th Baron Willoughby of Parham||1715||1765||
|-
|Baron North (1554)||Francis North, 7th Baron North||1734||1790||Created Earl of Guilford, see above
|-
|Baron Hunsdon (1559)||William Ferdinand Carey, 8th Baron Hunsdon||1702||1765||
|-
|rowspan="2"|Baron St John of Bletso (1559)||John St John, 11th Baron St John of Bletso||1722||1757||Died
|-
|John St John, 12th Baron St John of Bletso||1757||1767||
|-
|Baron De La Warr (1570)||John West, 7th Baron De La Warr||1723||1766||
|-
|Baron Petre (1603)||Robert Petre, 9th Baron Petre||1742||1801||
|-
|rowspan="2"|Baron Arundell of Wardour (1605)||Henry Arundell, 7th Baron Arundell of Wardour||1746||1756||Died
|-
|Henry Arundell, 8th Baron Arundell of Wardour||1756||1808||
|-
|Baron Dormer (1615)||Charles Dormer, 6th Baron Dormer||1728||1761||
|-
|Baron Teynham (1616)||Henry Roper, 10th Baron Teynham||1727||1781||
|-
|Baron Craven (1627)||Fulwar Craven, 4th Baron Craven||1739||1764||
|-
|rowspan="2"|Baron Clifford (1628)||Charlotte Cavendish, 6th Baroness Clifford||1753||1754||Title previously held by the Earls of Burlington; died
|-
|William Cavendish, 7th Baron Clifford||1754||1811||
|-
|Baron Maynard (1628)||Charles Maynard, 6th Baron Maynard||1745||1775||
|-
|Baron Leigh (1643)||Edward Leigh, 5th Baron Leigh||1749||1786||
|-
|Baron Byron (1643)||William Byron, 5th Baron Byron||1736||1798||
|-
|Baron Ward (1644)||John Ward, 6th Baron Ward||1740||1774||
|-
|Baron Langdale (1658)||Marmaduke Langdale, 4th Baron Langdale||1718||1771||
|-
|Baron Berkeley of Stratton (1658)||John Berkeley, 5th Baron Berkeley of Stratton||1741||1773||
|-
|Baron Cornwallis (1661)||Charles Cornwallis, 5th Baron Cornwallis||1722||1762||Created Earl Cornwallis, see above
|-
|Baron Delamer (1661)||Nathaniel Booth, 4th Baron Delamer||1758||1770||Title previously held by the Earls of Warrington 
|-
|Baron Arundell of Trerice (1664)||John Arundell, 4th Baron Arundell of Trerice||1706||1768||
|-
|Baron Clifford of Chudleigh (1672)||Hugh Clifford, 4th Baron Clifford of Chudleigh||1732||1783||
|-
|Baron Willoughby of Parham (1680)||Hugh Willoughby, 15th Baron Willoughby of Parham||1715||1765||
|-
|Baron Stawell (1683)||Edward Stawell, 4th Baron Stawell||1742||1755||Died, title extinct
|-
|Baron Guilford (1683)||Francis North, 3rd Baron Guilford||1729||1790||Created Earl of Guilford, see above
|-
|rowspan="2"|Baron Barnard (1698)||Gilbert Vane, 2nd Baron Barnard||1723||1753||
|-
|Henry Vane, 3rd Baron Barnard||1753||1758||Created Earl of Darlington, see above
|-
|Baron Conway (1703)||Francis Seymour-Conway, 2nd Baron Conway||1732||1794||Created Earl of Hertford, see above
|-
|colspan=5 style="background: #fcc" align="center"|Peerage of Scotland
|-
|Lord Somerville (1430)||James Somerville, 13th Lord Somerville||1709||1765||
|-
|Lord Forbes (1442)||James Forbes, 15th Lord Forbes||1734||1761||
|-
|rowspan=2|Lord Saltoun (1445)||Alexander Fraser, 14th Lord Saltoun||1748||1751||Died
|-
|George Fraser, 15th Lord Saltoun||1748||1781||
|-
|Lord Gray (1445)||John Gray, 11th Lord Gray||1738||1782||
|-
|Lord Cathcart (1460)||Charles Cathcart, 9th Lord Cathcart||1740||1776||
|-
|Lord Sempill (1489)||John Sempill, 13th Lord Sempill||1746||1782||
|-
|rowspan=2|Lord Ross (1499)||George Ross, 13th Lord Ross||1738||1754||Died
|-
|William Ross, 14th Lord Ross||1754||1754||Died, peerage extinct
|-
|rowspan=2|Lord Elphinstone (1509)||Charles Elphinstone, 9th Lord Elphinstone||1718||1757||Died
|-
|Charles Elphinstone, 10th Lord Elphinstone||1757||1781||
|-
|rowspan=2|Lord Torphichen (1564)||James Sandilands, 7th Lord Torphichen||1696||1753||Died
|-
|Walter Sandilands, 8th Lord Torphichen||1753||1765||
|-
|Lord Lindores (1600)||Alexander Leslie, 6th Lord Lindores||1719||1765||
|-
|Lord Colville of Culross (1604)||Alexander Colville, 7th Lord Colville of Culross||1741||1770||
|-
|rowspan=2|Lord Blantyre (1606)||Walter Stuart, 8th Lord Blantyre||1743||1751||Died
|-
|William Stuart, 9th Lord Blantyre||1751||1776||
|-
|Lord Cranstoun (1609)||James Cranstoun, 6th Lord Cranstoun||1727||1773||
|-
|rowspan=3|Lord Aston of Forfar (1627)||James Aston, 5th Lord Aston of Forfar||1748||1751||Died
|-
|Philip Aston, 6th Lord Aston of Forfar||1751||1755||Died
|-
|Walter Aston, 7th Lord Aston of Forfar||1755||1763||
|-
|Lord Fairfax of Cameron (1627)||Thomas Fairfax, 6th Lord Fairfax of Cameron||1710||1781||
|-
|Lord Napier (1627)||Francis Napier, 6th Lord Napier||1706||1773||
|-
|Lord Reay (1628)||Donald Mackay, 4th Lord Reay||1748||1761||
|-
|Lord Kirkcudbright (1633)||William Maclellan, 7th Lord Kirkcudbright||1730||1762||
|-
|Lord Forrester (1633)||William Forrester, 7th Lord Forrester||1748||1763||
|-
|Lord Banff (1642)||Alexander Ogilvy, 7th Lord Banff||1746||1771||
|-
|Lord Elibank (1643)||Patrick Murray, 5th Lord Elibank||1736||1778||
|-
|rowspan=2|Lord Falconer of Halkerton (1646)||David Falconer, 4th Lord Falconer of Halkerton||1724||1751||Died
|-
|Alexander Falconer, 5th Lord Falconer of Halkerton||1751||1762||
|-
|Lord Belhaven and Stenton (1647)||John Hamilton, 4th Lord Belhaven and Stenton||1721||1764||
|-
|rowspan=2|Lord Rollo (1651)||Robert Rollo, 4th Lord Rollo||1700||1758||Died
|-
|Andrew Rollo, 5th Lord Rollo||1758||1763||
|-
|Lord Ruthven of Freeland (1650)||Isobel Ruthven, 4th Lady Ruthven of Freeland||1722||1783||
|-
|rowspan=2|Lord Bellenden (1661)||Ker Bellenden, 4th Lord Bellenden||1741||1753||Died
|-
|John Ker Bellenden, 5th Lord Bellenden||1753||1796||
|-
|rowspan=2|Lord Kinnaird (1682)||Charles Kinnaird, 5th Lord Kinnaird||1727||1758||Died
|-
|Charles Kinnaird, 6th Lord Kinnaird||1758||1767||
|-
|}

References

 

1750
1750s in England
1750s in Ireland
1750s in Scotland
Peers
Peers
Peers
Peers
Peers
Peers
18th-century nobility